Cho Hae-jin (born 1976) is a South Korean writer.

Life 
Cho Hae-jin was born in 1976 in Seoul, and graduated from the Ewha Womans University in education, and then graduated from the same university's graduate school in Korean literature. She began her literary career in 2004 when she won the Munye Joongang Literary Award for Best First Novel.

In late 2008, she taught students in Korean studies at a university in Poland, working as a Korean language teacher for about a year. At this time she read an article about North Korean defectors in Belgium, and this led to the publication of her second novel I Met Lo Kiwan (로기완을 만났다).

In 2013, I Met Lo Kiwan (로기완을 만났다) won the 31st Sin Dong-yup Prize for Literature, and in 2016 she won the 17th Lee Hyo-seok Literary Award for short story "Sanchaekja-ui haengbok" (산책자의 행복 Happiness of a Walker).

Writing 
Literary critic Shin Hyeongcheol wrote in the commentary for Cho Hae-jin's first novel that "this author writes only about those that are physically dying, or are already dead socially." Also, literary critic Go Inhwan has stated of Cho's novels that they "start from the interest on the lives of others, and then through the painful process of seeping into their lives, they allow the readers to become infused in their inner selves with the lives of others", and that they have "blindingly clear patterns of communication that are engraved in the inner sides of readers."

Cho has clearly stated her opinion on literature, saying "fundamentally, literature, and also literature's identity, is like this. Dealing with the nameless people, and the problem of status and ethics, I believe, is not only literature's nature, but a common topic for all writers. Because those that don’t lack anything I'm sure the other media will remember on their own."

Works

Short story collections 
 Bitui howi (빛의 호위 The Guard of Light), Changbi, 2017. .
 Mokyo-il-e mannayo (목요일에 만나요 Let's Meet On Thursday), Munhakdongne, 2014. .
 City of Angels (천사들의 도시), Minumsa, 2008. .

Novels 
 Yeoreumeul jinagada (여름을 지나가다 Passing Summer), Munye Joongang, 2015. . 
 A Forest That No One Has Seen (아무도 보지 못한 숲), Minumsa, 2013. .
 I Met Lo Kiwan (로기완을 만났다), Changbi, 2011. .
 Haneopsi meotjin kkum-e (한없이 멋진 꿈에 On an Endlessly Wonderful Dream), Munhakdongne, 2009. .

Works in translation 
 Я встретила Ро Кивана (I met Lo Kiwan) (Russian)

Awards 
 2016 "Sanchaekja-ui haengbok" (산책자의 행복 Happiness of a Walker) Lee Hyo-seok Literary Award.
 2014 Bitui howi (빛의 호위 The Guard of Light) 5th Young Writers' Award.
 2013, I Met Lo Kiwan (로기완을 만났다) 31st Sin Dong-yup Prize for Literature
 2004, "Yeoja-ege gileul mutda" (여자에게 길을 묻다 Asking for Directions to a Woman), Munye Joongang New Writer's Award.

Further reading 
 Book review: Я встретила Ро Кивана (I met Lo Kiwan) (English)
 Book review: I met Lot Kiwan (English)
 Book review: A Forest That No One Has Seen (English)
 Essay: The Journey to Meet Lo Kiwan (English)
 Significance of North Korean Defectors in Fiction (English) 
 ｢세상서 지워져가는 벼랑끝 인생들｣, 󰡔세계일보󰡕, 2008년 10월 17일. { "Lives On the Brink That are Disappearing From the World", Segye Ilbo, October 17, 2008. }
 ｢'엘'이 어느날 ‘로기완’이 됐다｣, 󰡔한겨레신문󰡕, 2011년 4월 29일. { "'El' One Day Became 'Lo Kiwan'", The Hankyoreh, April 29, 2011. }
 ｢삶의 변곡점 위 담담한 고백들- [리뷰] 소설집 ‘빛의 호위｣, 󰡔한국일보󰡕, 2017년 2월 17일. { "Calm Confessions Upon Turning Points of Life – [Review] Short Story Collection 'The Guard of Light'", Hankook Ilbo, February 17, 2017. }
 김미정, ｢그럼에도 공감과 우정은 어떻게 가능한가: 조해진 소설집 󰡔천사들의 도시󰡕｣, 󰡔창작과비평󰡕, 2009년 봄호. { Kim, Mijeong, "Then How Are Empathy and Friendship Possible: Cho Hae-jin's Short Story Collection, City of Angels", The Quarterly Changbi, Spring 2009. }
 박인성, ｢이토록 충만한 결핍 : 조해진 장편소설 『로기완을 만났다』｣, 󰡔창작과비평󰡕, 2011년 가을호. { Park, Inseong, "Such an Abundant Absence: Cho Hae-jin\s Novel I Met Lo Kiwan", The Quarterly Changbi, Fall 2011. }
 허정, ｢타인의 고통과 증상과의 동일시 :  조해진의 『로기완을 만났다』를 예로 하여｣, 󰡔코기토󰡕, 부산대학교 인문학연구소, 2014. { Heo, Jeong, “ Identification With Symptoms of Pains of Others: With the Example of Cho Hae-jin’s I Met Lo Kiwan”, Cogito, Pusan National University Humanities Institute 2014. }
 이경진, ｢외국어로 말 걸기: 조해진과 백수린의 소설을 중심으로｣, 󰡔창작과비평󰡕, 2014년 여름호. { Lee, Kyeongjin, "Talking In a Foreign Language: On the Works of Cho Hae-jin and Baek Surin|, The Quarterly Changbi, Summer 2014. }
 류수연, ｢생존이라는 부정방정식: 조해진론｣, 󰡔오늘의 문예비평󰡕, 2017. { Ryu, Suyeong, "The Indeterminate Equation of Survival: On Cho Hae-jin", Literary Criticism Today, 2017. }

References 

1976 births
Living people
South Korean writers
South Korean women writers
Ewha Womans University alumni
People from Seoul